The 1972 NCAA University Division Cross Country Championships were the 34th annual cross country meet to determine the team and individual national champions of men's collegiate cross country running in the United States. Held on November 20, 1972, the meet was hosted by the University of Houston at the Glenbrook Golf Course in Houston, Texas. The distance for this race was 6 miles (9.7 kilometers).

All NCAA University Division members were eligible to qualify for the meet. In total, 25 teams and 241 individual runners contested this championship.

The team national championship was won by the Tennessee Volunteers, their first title. The individual championship was won by Neil Cusack, from East Tennessee State, with a time of 28:23.00.

Men's title
Distance: 6 miles (9.7 kilometers)

Team Result (Top 10)

See also
NCAA Men's College Division Cross Country Championship

References

NCAA Cross Country Championships
NCAA University Division Cross Country Championships
NCAA Division I Cross Country Championships
NCAA Division I Cross Country Championships
University of Houston
Track and field in Texas
Sports competitions in Houston